Mount Prater is a 13,471-foot-elevation (4,106 meter) mountain summit located on the shared border of Fresno County and Inyo County in California, United States.

Description
The peak is set on the crest of the Sierra Nevada mountain range, just south of the Palisades area. It is also situated on the boundary shared by Kings Canyon National Park and John Muir Wilderness. Precipitation runoff from this mountain drains east to Tinemaha Reservoir via Tinemaha Creek, and south into headwaters of South Fork Kings River.

Climbing
The John Muir Trail, which passes below the western base of the peak, provides a climbing approach option. The first ascent of the summit was made in 1928 by Alfred William Prater and his wife. The North Ridge was first climbed by Fred L. Jones on October 6, 1948. "Obvious Chute" was first climbed March 19, 1972, by Ed Treacy, Karl Bennett, Dave Gladstone, Dave King, Vi Grasso and Doug Mantle. "Hidden Couloir" on the East Face was first climbed by Del Johns and Wayne N. Sawka in late September 1980. Inclusion on the Sierra Peaks Section peakbagging list generates climbing interest in this peak.

Etymology
This landform's name commemorates Alfred William Prater (1902–1929), mathematics professor at University of California and the mountaineer who was first to climb this peak with his wife in the summer of 1928. The toponym was officially adopted in 1930 by the United States Board on Geographic Names.

Climate
Mount Prater is located in an alpine climate zone. Most weather fronts originate in the Pacific Ocean, and travel east toward the Sierra Nevada mountains. As fronts approach, they are forced upward by the peaks (orographic lift), causing them to drop their moisture in the form of rain or snowfall onto the range.

See also
 
 Sequoia-Kings Canyon Wilderness

Gallery

References

External links
 Weather forecast: Mount Prater

Mountains of Fresno County, California
Mountains of Inyo County, California
Mountains of Kings Canyon National Park
North American 4000 m summits
Mountains of Northern California
Sierra Nevada (United States)
Mountains of the John Muir Wilderness
Inyo National Forest